The Immortals is a 1995 action thriller film produced by Elie Samaha and directed by Brian Grant. Eric Roberts, Tia Carrere, Joe Pantoliano, Chris Rock, William Forsythe, Clarence Williams III and Tony Curtis feature in this film.

Plot summary
A crafty nightclub owner (Jack) brings together a group of small-time hoods and teams them up in unusual pairs (black man and white racist, Ivy Leaguer and simpleton) for a set of multiple heists which turn out to be an elaborate double cross against a notorious gangster (Dominic). During an extended standoff in a nightclub between Jack and his band of thieves and Dominic's henchman, the hoods discover why Jack brought them all together for what amounts to a suicidal mission.

External links 
 
 
 

1995 films
HIV/AIDS in American films
American crime thriller films
1995 crime thriller films
Films about organized crime in the United States
1995 action thriller films
Films produced by Elie Samaha
1990s English-language films
1990s American films